Masiniyeh or Moseyniyeh may refer to:
 Masiniyeh-ye Olya
 Masiniyeh-ye Sofla

See also
 Mohseniyeh